Jack Gamble is a former professional rugby league footballer who played in the 1960s.

Playing career

County honours
Jack Gamble won a cap playing , i.e. number 3, for Yorkshire while at Castleford in the 15-9 victory over New Zealand at Castleford's stadium on 20 September 1965.

County League appearances
Jack Gamble played in Castleford's victory in the Yorkshire County League during the 1964–65 season.

References

External links
Search for "Gamble" at rugbyleagueproject.org
Jack Gamble Memory Box Search at archive.castigersheritage.com

Living people
Castleford Tigers players
English rugby league players
Place of birth missing (living people)
Rugby league centres
Year of birth missing (living people)
Yorkshire rugby league team players